Table Tennis at the 2004 Summer Paralympics was staged at the Galatsi Olympic Hall from September 18 to September 27.

Competitors were divided into ten classes according to the extent of their disability, with lower numbered classes corresponding to more severe disabilities. Classes one through five competed in wheelchairs and classes six through ten competed while standing.

Participating countries

Medal summary

Medal table

Men's events

Women's events

See also
Table tennis at the 2004 Summer Olympics

 
2004 Summer Paralympics events
2004
2004 in table tennis
Table tennis competitions in Greece
Galatsi Olympic Hall events